Rhododendron trichanthum (长毛杜鹃) is a rhododendron species native to western Sichuan, China, where it grows at altitudes of . The flowers are pale purple, rose red, or white.

References
 Rehder, J. Arnold Arbor. 26: 480. 1945.

trichanthum